CineTel Films Inc. is an independent film production company and distributor based in West Hollywood, California.

History
The company was founded in Chicago in 1980 as Chicago Teleproductions and later  moved the company's headquarters to Los Angeles, California and renamed as CineTel Films in 1983. Paul Hertzberg founded CineTel Films.

Filmography

1980s 

 Screen Test (1985) 
 Star Knight (1985) 
 Say Yes (1986) 
 The Climb (1986) 
 Hardbodies 2 (1986) 
 Armed Response (1986) 
 Captive (1986) 
 Cyclone (1987) 
 Cold Steel (1987)
 Bulletproof (1987) 
 Deadly Illusion (1987) 
 Out of the Dark (1988) 
 Fear (1988) 
 976-EVIL (1988) 
 Hit List (1989) 
 Relentless (1989) 
 Tripwire (1989)

1990s 
Far Out Man (1990)
Masters of Menace (1990)
Too Much Sun (1990)
Fast Getaway (1990)
Payback (1991)
Past Midnight (1991)
976-Evil II (1991)
Where the Day Takes You (1992)
Dead On: Relentless II (1992)
We're Talking Serious Money (1992)
Sins of Desire (1993)
Entangled (1993)
Relentless 3 (1993)
Class of 1999 II: The Substitute (1994)
Teresa's Tattoo (1994)
Dangerous Touch (1994)
Fast Getaway II (1994)
Ghoulies IV (1994)
Relentless IV: Ashes to Ashes (1994)
Dream a Little Dream 2 (1995)
Excessive Force II: Force on Force (1995)
Carried Away (1996)
Demolition High (1996)
Dead Girl (1996)
Vampirella (1996)
Sci-fighters (1996)
Poison Ivy II (1996)
Below Utopia (1997)
Stir (1997)
Poison Ivy: The New Seduction (1997)
Demolition University (1997)
Storm Trooper (1997)
The Pandora Project (1998)
Telling You (1998)
Butter (1998)
The Assault (1998)
Out of Control (1998)
Prague Duet (1998)
Supreme Sanction (1999)
The Settlement (1999)
Judgment Day (1999)

2000s 
Chain of Command (2000)
Meeting Daddy (2000)
A Rumor of Angels (2000)
Green Sails (2000)
They Crawl (2001)
Guardian (2001)
The Tracker (2001)
Time Lapse (2001)
Project Viper (2002)
Storm Watch (2002)
Malevolent (2002)
Scorcher (2002)
Con Express (2002)
Global Effect (2002)
Hot Desire (2003)
Detonator (2003)
Written in Blood (2003)
Lost Treasure (2003)
Momentum (2003)
Deadly Swarm (2003)
Devil Winds (2003)
I Accuse (2003)
Island Rhythms (2003)
Snakehead Terror (2004)
Gargoyle (2004)
Descent (2005)
Crash Landing (2005)
Sub Zero (2005)
Premonition (2005)
Komodo vs. Cobra (2005)
Cerebus (2005)
Caved In (2006)
Solar Attack (2006)
Dark Storm (2006)
Earthstorm (2006)
Not My Life (2006)
A.I. Assault (2006)
Fire Serpent (2007)
Termination Point (2007)
Secrets of an Undercover Wife (2007)
Judicial Indiscretion (2007)
Post Mortem (2007)
Perfect Child (2007)
Hallowed Ground (2007)
Bone Eater (2007)
Beyond Loch Ness (2008)
Ogre (2008)
Storm Cell (2008)
Poison Ivy: The Secret Society (2008)
Cat City (2008)
The Secret Lives of Second Wives (2008)
Sea Beast (2008)
Ba'al (2008)
Trial by Fire (2008)
Kill Switch (2008)
National Lampoon's Ratko: The Dictator's Son (2009)
Wyvern (2009)
Hydra (2009)
Polar Storm (2009)
Fire from Below (2009)
Tommy and the Cool Mule (2009)
Aussie & Ted's Great Adventure (2009)
Smile (2009)
Ice Twisters (2009)

2010s 

 Dolph Lundgren is the Killing Machine (2010)
 I Spit on Your Grave (2010)
 Mongolian Death Worm (2010)
 Stonehenge Apocalypse (2010)
 Goblin (2010)
 Mandrake (2010)
 Ice Quake (2010)
 Behemoth (2011)
 Iron Golem (2011)
 Ghost Storm (2011)
 Camel Spiders (2011)
 Collision Earth (2011)
 Mega Cyclone (2011)
 Doomsday Prophecy (2011)
 Seeds of Destruction (2011)
 Earth's Final Hours (2011)
 Super Shark (2011)
 Snowmageddon (2011)
 The Philadelphia Experiment (2012)
 The Riverbank (2012)
 The 12 Disasters of Christmas (2012)
 End of the World (2013)
 Independence Daysaster (2013)
 I Spit on Your Grave 2 (2013)
 Embrace of the Vampire (2013)
 Grave Halloween (2013)
 The Cure (2014)
 Apocalypse Tomorrow (2014)
 Free Fall (2014)
 Christmas Icetastrophe (2014)
 LA Apocalypse (2015)
 Fire Twister (2015)
 Earthfall (2015)
 Lavalantula (2015)
 I Spit on Your Grave: Vengeance is Mine (2015)
 They Fond Hell (2015)
 Sharkansas Women's Prison Massacre (2015)
 Stormageddon (2015)
 Vigilante Diaries (2016)
 Drone Wars (2016)
 Dam Sharks (2016)
 2 Lava 2 Lantula! (2016)
 Earthtastrophe (2016)
 Shadows of the Dead (2016)
 Mind Blown (2016)
 All I Wish (2017)
 Global Meltdown (2017)
 Doomsday Device (2017)
 Karma (2018)
 The Amityville Murders (2018)
 Kill Chain (2019)
 Acceleration (2019)
 2nd Chance for Christmas (2019)
 The Boy, the Dog and the Clown (2019)

2020s 

 The Penthouse (2021)

References

External links 

Film production companies of the United States
Film distributors of the United States
American companies established in 1980
Entertainment companies established in 1980
Mass media companies established in 1980
Companies based in Los Angeles County, California
Entertainment companies based in California
1980 establishments in Illinois